Liège (M943) is the seventh ship in the City / Vlissingen-class mine countermeasures vessels, and fourth to be built for the Belgian Navy.

References

Mine warfare vessel classes
Minehunters of Belgium